Tim Collins (born 2 October 1975) is a Bermudian equestrian. He competed in the individual eventing at the 2004 Summer Olympics.

He is the brother of Bermudian equestrian Annabelle Collins.

References

External links
 

1975 births
Living people
Bermudian male equestrians
Olympic equestrians of Bermuda
Equestrians at the 2004 Summer Olympics
Place of birth missing (living people)